Nichelle Nichols (born Grace Dell Nichols; December 28, 1932 – July 30, 2022) was an American actress, singer, and dancer best known for her portrayal of Uhura in Star Trek and its film sequels. Nichols' portrayal of Uhura was groundbreaking for African American actresses on American television. From 1977 until 2015, Nichols volunteered her time to promote NASA's programs and recruit diverse astronauts, including some of the first female and ethnic minority astronauts.

Nichols was born in Robbins, Illinois, a Chicago suburb. She trained in dance, and began her career as a dancer, singer, and model in Chicago. She went into stage acting, and had a television and film career.

Early life 

Grace Dell Nichols was born the third of six children on December 28, 1932, in Robbins, Illinois, a suburb of Chicago, to Samuel Earl Nichols, a factory worker who was elected both town mayor of Robbins in 1929 and its chief magistrate, and his wife, Lishia (Parks) Nichols, a homemaker. Disliking her name, Nichols asked her parents for a new one; they offered "Nichelle", which they said meant "victorious maiden" (from Nike and the suffix -elle). Later, the family moved into an apartment in the Woodlawn neighborhood of Chicago. Nichols attended Englewood High School, from which she graduated in 1951. From age 12, she studied dance at the Chicago Ballet Academy.

Career 
Nichols began her professional career as a singer and dancer in Chicago. She then toured the United States and Canada with the bands of Duke Ellington and Lionel Hampton. In 1959, she appeared as the principal dancer in the film version of Porgy and Bess Nichols' acting break came in an appearance in Kicks and Co., Oscar Brown's highly touted but ill-fated 1961 musical. In a thinly veiled satire of Playboy magazine, she played Hazel Sharpe, a voluptuous campus queen who was being tempted by the devil and Orgy Magazine to become "Orgy Maiden of the Month". Although the play closed after a short run in Chicago, Nichols attracted the attention of Hugh Hefner, the publisher of Playboy, who booked her as a singer for his Chicago Playboy Club. She also appeared in the role of Carmen for a Chicago stock company production of Carmen Jones and performed in a New York production of Porgy and Bess. Between acting and singing engagements, Nichols did occasional modeling work.

In January 1967, Nichols also was featured on the cover of Ebony magazine, and had two feature articles in the publication in five years. Nichols continued touring the United States, Canada, and Europe as a singer with the Duke Ellington and Lionel Hampton bands. On the West Coast, she appeared in The Roar of the Greasepaint and For My People and she garnered high praise for her performance in the James Baldwin play Blues for Mister Charlie. Prior to being cast as Lieutenant Uhura in Star Trek, Nichols was a guest actress on television producer Gene Roddenberry's first series The Lieutenant (1964) in an episode, "To Set It Right", which dealt with racial prejudice.

Star Trek 

On Star Trek, Nichols was one of the first Black women featured in a major television series. Her prominent supporting role as a bridge officer was unprecedented. Nichols was once tempted to leave the series; however, a conversation with Martin Luther King Jr. changed her mind. Towards the end of the first season, Nichols was given the opportunity to take a role on Broadway. She preferred the stage to the television studio, so she decided to take the role. Nichols went to Roddenberry's office, told him that she planned to leave, and handed him her resignation letter. Roddenberry tried to convince Nichols to stay but to no avail, so he told her to take the weekend off and if she still felt that she should leave then he would give her his blessing. That weekend, Nichols attended a banquet that was being run by the NAACP, where she was informed that a fan really wanted to meet her.

King personally encouraged her to stay on the series, saying she "could not give up" because she was playing a vital role model for Black children and young women across the country, as well as for other children who would see Black people appearing as equals, going so far as to favorably compare her work on the series to the marches of the ongoing civil rights movement. This response by King left Nichols speechless, allowing her to realize how important to the civil rights movement her role was, and the next day she went back to Roddenberry's office to tell him that she would stay. When she told Roddenberry what King had said, tears came to his eyes. Nichols asked Roddenberry for her role back and Roddenberry took out her resignation letter, which he had already torn up. Former NASA astronaut Mae Jemison has cited Nichols' role of Lieutenant Uhura as her inspiration for wanting to become an astronaut and Whoopi Goldberg has also spoken of Nichols' influence. Goldberg asked for a role on Star Trek: The Next Generation, and the character Guinan was specially created, while Jemison appeared on an episode of the series.

In her role as Lieutenant Uhura, Nichols kissed white actor William Shatner as Captain James T. Kirk in the November 22, 1968, Star Trek episode "Plato's Stepchildren". The episode has been cited as the first example of an interracial kiss on U.S. television, although several earlier instances have been identified. The Shatner/Nichols kiss was seen as groundbreaking, even though it was portrayed as having been forced by alien telekinesis. There was some praise and almost no dissent. In her autobiography Beyond Uhura, Star Trek and Other Memories, Nichols cited a letter from a white Southerner who wrote, "I am totally opposed to the mixing of the races. However, any time a red-blooded American boy like Captain Kirk gets a beautiful dame in his arms that looks like Uhura, he ain't gonna fight it." During the Comedy Central Roast of Shatner on August 20, 2006, Nichols jokingly referred to the kiss and said, "what do you say, let's make a little more TV history ... and kiss my black ass!"

Despite the cancellation of the series in 1969, Star Trek lived on in other ways, and continued to play a part in Nichols' life. She again provided the voice of Uhura in Star Trek: The Animated Series; in one episode, "The Lorelei Signal", Uhura assumes command of the Enterprise. Nichols noted in her autobiography her frustration that this never happened on the original series. Nichols co-starred in six Star Trek films, the last one being Star Trek VI: The Undiscovered Country. Following the death of Leonard Nimoy in 2015, and until her own death in July 2022, Nichols was one of four surviving cast members, the others being William Shatner, George Takei, and Walter Koenig.

Other acting roles 

In 1994, Nichols published her autobiography Beyond Uhura: Star Trek and Other Memories. In it, she claimed that the role of Peggy Fair in the television series Mannix was offered to her during the final season of Star Trek, but producer Gene Roddenberry refused to release her from her contract. Between the end of the original series and the Star Trek animated series and feature films, Nichols appeared in small television and film roles. She briefly appeared as a secretary in Doctor, You've Got to Be Kidding! (1967), and portrayed Dorienda, a foul-mouthed madam in Truck Turner (1974) opposite Isaac Hayes, her only appearance in a blaxploitation film.

Nichols appeared in animated form as one of Al Gore's Vice Presidential Action Rangers in the "Anthology of Interest I" episode of Futurama, and she provided the voice of her own head in a glass jar in the episode "Where No Fan Has Gone Before". She voiced the recurring role of Elisa Maza's mother Diane Maza in the animated series Gargoyles, and played Thoth-Kopeira in an episode of Batman: The Animated Series. In 2004, she provided the voice for herself in The Simpsons episode "Simple Simpson". In the comedy film Snow Dogs (2002), Nichols appeared as the mother of the male lead, played by Cuba Gooding Jr. In 2006, she appeared as the title character in the film Lady Magdalene's, the madam of a legal Nevada brothel in tax default. She also served as executive producer and choreographer, and sang three songs in the film, two of which she composed. She was twice nominated for the Chicago theatrical Sarah Siddons Award for Best Actress. The first nomination was for her portrayal of Hazel Sharpe in Kicks and Co.; the second for her performance in The Blacks.

Nichols played a recurring role on the second season of the NBC drama Heroes. Her first appearance was on the episode "Kindred", which aired October 8, 2007. She portrayed Nana Dawson, the matriarch of a New Orleans family financially and personally devastated by Hurricane Katrina, who cares for her orphaned grandchildren and her great-nephew, series regular Micah Sanders. In 2008, Nichols starred in the film The Torturer, playing the role of a psychiatrist. In 2009, she joined the cast of The Cabonauts, a sci-fi musical comedy that debuted on DailyMotion. Playing CJ, the CEO of the Cabonauts Inc, Nichols is also featured singing and dancing. On August 30, 2016, she was introduced as the aging mother of Neil Winters on the long-standing soap opera The Young and the Restless. She received her first Daytime Emmy nomination in the "Outstanding Guest Performer in a Drama Series" category for this role March 22, 2017.

Music 
Nichols released two music albums. Down to Earth is a collection of standards released in 1967, during the original run of Star Trek. Out of This World, released in 1991, is more rock-oriented and is themed around Star Trek and space exploration.

As Uhura, Nichols sang songs on the Star Trek episodes "Charlie X" and "The Conscience of the King".

Work with NASA 

After the cancellation of Star Trek, Nichols volunteered her time in a special project with NASA to recruit minority and female personnel for the space agency. She began this work by making an affiliation between NASA and a company which she helped to run, Women in Motion.

The program was a success. Among those recruited were Dr. Sally Ride, the first American female astronaut, and United States Air Force Colonel Guion Bluford, the first African-American astronaut, as well as Dr. Judith Resnik and Dr. Ronald McNair, who both flew successful missions during the Space Shuttle program before their deaths in the Space Shuttle Challenger disaster on January 28, 1986. Recruits also included Charles Bolden, the former NASA administrator and veteran of four shuttle missions, Frederick D. Gregory, former deputy administrator and a veteran of three shuttle missions and Lori Garver, former deputy administrator. An enthusiastic advocate of space exploration, Nichols served from the mid-1980s on the board of governors of the National Space Institute (today's National Space Society), a nonprofit, educational space advocacy organization.

In late 2015, Nichols flew aboard NASA's Stratospheric Observatory for Infrared Astronomy (SOFIA) Boeing 747SP, which analyzed the atmospheres of Mars and Saturn on an eight hour, high-altitude mission. She was also a special guest at the Jet Propulsion Laboratory in Pasadena, California, on July 17, 1976, to view the Viking 1 soft landing on Mars. Along with the other cast members from the original Star Trek series, she attended the christening of the first space shuttle, Enterprise, at the North American Rockwell assembly facility in Palmdale, California. On July 14, 2010, she toured the space shuttle simulator and Mission Control at the Johnson Space Center.

Nichols' work with NASA is given significant focus in the documentary Woman in Motion about her life.

Personal life 

In her autobiography, Nichols wrote that she was romantically involved with Star Trek creator Gene Roddenberry for a few years in the 1960s. She said the affair ended well before Star Trek began, when she realized Roddenberry was also involved with her acquaintance Majel Hudec (known as Majel Barrett). Hudec went on to marry Gene Roddenberry and have a regular supporting role as nurse Christine Chapel on Star Trek. 

When Roddenberry's health was fading, Nichols co-wrote a song for him, entitled "Gene", which she sang at his funeral.

She wrote also that she had “a short, stormy, exciting relationship” with Sammy Davis Jr. in 1959. 

Nichols married twice, first to dancer Foster Johnson (1917–1981). They were married in 1951 and divorced that same year. Johnson and Nichols had one child together, Kyle Johnson, who was born August 14, 1951. She married for the second time, to Duke Mondy, in 1968. They divorced in 1972.

Nichols' younger brother, Thomas, was a member of the Heaven's Gate cult. He died on March 26, 1997, in the cult's mass suicide that purposefully coincided with the passing of Comet Hale–Bopp. A member for 20 years, he frequently identified himself as Nichelle's brother in promotional materials released by the cult.

On February 29, 2012, Nichols met with President Barack Obama in the Oval Office. She later tweeted about the meeting, "Months ago, [President] Obama was quoted as saying that he'd had a crush on me when he was younger," Nichols also wrote. "I asked about that and he proudly confirmed it! President Obama also confirmed for me that he was definitely a Trekker! How wonderful is that?!"

Nichols was a lifelong Democrat and a practicing Presbyterian.

Health and death
In June 2015, Nichols suffered a mild stroke at her Los Angeles home and was admitted to a Los Angeles–area hospital. A magnetic resonance imaging scan confirmed a small stroke had occurred, and she began inpatient therapy. In early 2018, Nichols was diagnosed with dementia, and subsequently announced her retirement from convention appearances. 

Following a legal dispute over the actions of her manager-turned-caretaker Gilbert Bell, her son Kyle Johnson filed for conservatorship in 2018. Before a court granted his petition in January 2019, Nichols' friend Angelique Fawcette, who had already expressed concern in 2017 over Bell's control of access to her, pressed for visitation rights, including by opposing Johnson's petition. That dispute and a 2019 court case by Bell over being evicted from the guesthouse on Nichols' property were both ongoing as of August 2021.

Nichols died of heart failure in Silver City, New Mexico, on July 30, 2022, at the age of 89.

Her ashes are due to be sent into space alongside Majel Barrett's and Douglas Trumbull's.

Recognition 
In 1982, Robert A. Heinlein dedicated his novel Friday to her. Asteroid 68410 Nichols is named in her honor.

In 1992, she was awarded a star on the Hollywood Walk of Fame, for her contribution to television.
Nichols received The Life Career Award, from the Academy of Science Fiction, Fantasy and Horror Films, in 2016, the first woman to receive it. The award was presented as part of the 42nd Saturn Awards ceremony. Nichols was awarded the Inkpot Award in 2018.

Nichols was an honorary member of Alpha Kappa Alpha sorority.

Udea nicholsae, a species of snout moths, was named in her honour.

Filmography

Films

Television

Video games and theme park attractions

Books

Discography
Down to Earth (Epic Records, 1967)
Uhuru Sings (aR-Way Productions, 1987)
Out of this World (GNP Crescendo, 1991)

See also 

 Kirk and Uhura's kiss
 Space Shuttle Enterprise
 Star Trek

References

Further reading 
 "The Week's Best Photos: Drummer's Delight". Jet. March 3, 1955. p. 36

External links 

 
 
 
 
 
 

1932 births
2022 deaths
20th-century American actresses
21st-century American actresses
Actresses from Chicago
Englewood Technical Prep Academy alumni
African-American actresses
African-American women singers
American autobiographers
American Presbyterians
American film actresses
American television actresses
American voice actresses
Deaths from congestive heart failure
Inkpot Award winners
People from Robbins, Illinois
Space burials
Star Trek fiction writers
Women autobiographers
Writers from Illinois